Daniel Marinel Celea (born 6 July 1995) is a Romanian professional footballer who plays as a defender forLiga I club Chindia Târgoviște.

Club career
On 24 August 2020, he signed a three-year contract with Polish I liga club ŁKS Łódź.

Honours

Club 
CSO Filiași
Liga IV – Dolj County: 2013–14
Sepsi OSK
Cupa României runner-up: 2019–20

References

External links
 
 
 

1995 births
People from Dolj County
Living people
Romanian footballers
Association football defenders
Sepsi OSK Sfântu Gheorghe players
FC UTA Arad players
CS Pandurii Târgu Jiu players
CS Mioveni players
ŁKS Łódź players
AFC Chindia Târgoviște players
Liga I players
Liga II players
Liga III players
I liga players
Romanian expatriate footballers
Expatriate footballers in Poland